ATP-binding cassette sub-family G member 4 is a protein that in humans is encoded by the ABCG4 gene.

The protein encoded by this gene is included in the ATP-binding cassette transporter (ABC protein) superfamily. ABC proteins transport various molecules across extra- and intra-cellular membranes. ABC genes are divided into seven distinct subfamilies (ABC1, MDR/TAP, MRP, ALD, OABP, GCN20, White). This protein is a member of the White subfamily and is expressed predominantly in liver tissue. The function has not yet been determined but may involve cholesterol transport. Alternate splice variants have been described but their full length sequences have not been determined.

ABCG4 has demonstrated, in vitro, to participate in the efflux of desmosterol and amyloid-β peptide (Aβ).  It is highly expressed in the brain, but its localization and function at the blood-brain barrier (BBB) level remain unknown.

See also
 ATP-binding cassette transporter

References

Further reading

External links 
 
 

Solute carrier family